Keystone Lake (also known as Keystone Reservoir and Plum Creek Reservoir) is a reservoir in Armstrong County in the U.S. state of Pennsylvania.

See also
 List of lakes in Pennsylvania
 List of dams and reservoirs in United States
 List of rivers of Pennsylvania
 List of tributaries of the Allegheny River

References

Reservoirs in Pennsylvania
Protected areas of Armstrong County, Pennsylvania
Bodies of water of Armstrong County, Pennsylvania